Chan Chi Hong (born 20 October 1976 in Hong Kong) is a former Hong Kong professional football player. He is currently the club-linked director at Hong Kong Football Association.

He is nicknamed Cowboy, as he is described by the fans that he always moves fast and freely in the field and looks very similar to a cowboy riding on his horse.

Career statistics
As of 20 September 2008

International career
As of 25 August 2009

References

External links
 Chan Chi Hong at HKFA
  
 SCAA Official Blog 13號 陳志康 (Chan Chi Hong) 
  

1976 births
Living people
Hong Kong footballers
Hong Kong international footballers
Association football wingers
Hong Kong First Division League players
Hong Kong Rangers FC players
Happy Valley AA players
South China AA players
TSW Pegasus FC managers
Hong Kong football managers
Hong Kong League XI representative players